The Outback is the vast, remote interior of Australia.

Outback may also refer to:

Fictional entities
Outback (G.I. Joe)
Outback (Transformers)

Film and TV
Outback, alternative title for Wake in Fright, a 1971 Australian-American film
Outback, alternative title for Minnamurra, a 1989 Australian film
The Outback, alternative title for Prey, a 2009 Australian film
The Outback, alternative title for Koala Kid, a 2012 CG animated film
Outback Truckers, alternative title for Outback Truckers, a 2012– TV series

Places
Outback (Region), a regional area of the Local Government Association of South Australia
Nebraska Outback, remote rural parts of north-central Nebraska
Oregon Outback, the high desert region of southeastern Oregon

Sports
Australian Outbacks, the national gridiron team
Outback Champions Series, professional tennis events

Other uses
Outback (group), a 1980s musical group
Outback Steakhouse, an American restaurant chain
Subaru Outback, an automobile
 Outback (album)

See also
 R.M. Williams Outback, an Australian magazine
Outback Communities Authority, a government agency in South Australia